The third of three 1951 Buenos Aires Grand Prix (official name: Gran Premio de Eva Duarte Perón - Sport) was a Sports Car Grand Prix motor race (over 1500cc S+1.5) that took place on March 18, 1951, at the Costanero Norte circuit in Buenos Aires, Argentina. The race was also known as the "Buenos Aires National" and was part of the Argentine Nationals racing series.  

Results from the 1951 Buenos Aires Grand Prix for Sports Cars:

Classification

References

Buenos Aires Grand Prix (III)
Buenos Aires Grand Prix
Buenos Aires Grand Prix (III)